Yengeç Sepeti is a 1994 Turkish drama film directed by Yavuz Özkan.

Cast
Derya Alabora
Sadri Alışık
Macide Tanır
Mehmet Aslantuğ
Şahika Tekand
 Ege Aydan
 Sedef Ecer
 Oktay Kaynarca
 Berna Tunalı
 Bora Kaskan

Awards
 Yengeç Sepeti won five awards at the 1994 Antalya Golden Orange Film Festival

References

External links 

1994 drama films
1994 films
Turkish drama films
1990s Turkish-language films